is a railway station in Kashiba, Nara Prefecture, Japan. It is on the Osaka Line operated by the Kintetsu Railway.

Layout
Sekiya Station has two side platforms serving two tracks.

Platforms

Adjacent stations

Railway stations in Nara Prefecture